Mobile 101  (original title: Made in Finland) is a Finnish drama series chronicling the rise of Nokia to one of the largest mobile phone manufacturers in the world.  It first aired in 2022 on C More Finland. The series focuses on the years 1988–1990 when the company was creating its first GSM phone, the Nokia 101.

Historical background 

The series is set in 1988–1990 which was a turning point in Nokia's history. The company's first mobile phone, the Mobira Cityman, came out in 1987. The following year, Motorola sued Nokia for patent infringements and the company's CEO Kairamo committed suicide due to mental illness, leaving the company in difficult situation.

Overview 

The series stars lawyers and engineers working at Nokia, as well as future CEO Jorma Ollila, played by Sampo Sarkola, who is at the time an up-and-comer in the company. His predecessor, CEO Kari Kairamo is played by Kristo Salminen.

Newly graduated lawyers, Katarina Tammi (Satu-Tuuli Karhu) and Aki Makkonen (Emil Kihlström), are hired by Nokia. Aki suffers from panic attacks. They will have to defend Nokia in a lawsuit in the United States against Motorola for patent infringement.

Meanwhile, a talented and introverted engineer from Oulu, Risto Salminen (Aku Sipola), is developing the world's smallest NMT phone on his own time and partly in secret, with the support of his wife and colleague Vuokko Salminen (Oona Airola). Their mutual efforts result in the Nokia 101.

Cast and characters

Main

 Satu Tuuli Karhu as Katarina Tammi
 Emil Kihlström as Aki Makkonen
 Sampo Sarkola as Jorma Ollila
 Aku Sipola as Risto Salminen

Recurring

 Oona Airola as Vuokko Salminen
 Kristo Salminen as Kari Kairamo
 Joonas Kääriäinen as Teuvo Muhonen
 Markus Järvenpää as Matti Saarinen
 Elmer Bäck as Pentti Kouri
 Pelle Heikkilä as Antti Lagerroos
 Eero Saarinen as Jaakko Lassila
 Robert Enckell as Mika Tiivola
 Martin Bahne as Olli-Pekka Kallasvuo
 Jukka Puotila as Simo Vuorilehto
 Mika Nuojua as Pekka Suutari
 Laura Malmivaara as Liisa Ollila
 Niina Nurminen as Barbro Nyqvist
 Jouko Klemettilä as Harry Mildh
 Jussi-Petteri Peräinen as engineer Erkkilä
 Tuomas Nilsson as engineer Hakanen
 Karlo Haapiainen as Tapio Vainio
 Paavo Kinnunen as Kalle Helkinen
 Marko Nurmi as Lassi Forssman
 Hannu-Pekka Björkman as Pekka Herlin
 Timo Tuominen as Harri Holkeri
 Dennis Nylund as Björn Wahlroos
 Sanna-June Hyde as Patricia Rantala
 Rafael Edholm as Eric Steward
 Ian Bourgeot as Maurice Allais

Production

Script 
Series creator Maarit Lalli became interested in how Nokia's success came about and its impact on the city of Salo. She decided to make a film on the subject in 2013 after hearing that Microsoft had bought Nokia's mobile phone operations. In 2018, producer Minna Haapkylä from Rabbit Films got excited about Lalli’s concept, and the two expanded the idea to a television series. Lassi Vierikko, Jyrki Väisänen and others worked with Lalli on the script as well as Lalli's son Henrik Mäki-Tanila.

The events in the series are based on real events, except for the characters' private lives. During the scriptwriting process, she interviewed countless prior and current Nokia employees.

There are currently plans in motion for a second and third season.

Funding 
Mobile 101 is produced by Aurora Studios and Rabbit Films, which also distributes the series internationally. The series received significant support during the scripting phase from MTV3 Finland , whose investment in the script was the largest ever.

Filming 
The filming of the series began in Oulu, in April 2021. Filming continued in various locations around Finland, such as Helsinki, Turku and Salo until the end of the year. Many of the locations were the actual locations used by Nokia at the time. Filming also continued in Munich, Germany.

The series was filmed during the COVID-19 pandemic, which created some challenges. For example, all group scenes had to be limited to 15 people.

Sampo Sarkola and Aku Sipola described Lalli's directorial style as almost anarchistic. Satu-Tuuli Karhu and Emil Kihlström said that Lalli had given a lot of room for the actors’ interpretation.

A minidocumentary about the making of the series called “The Making of Made in Finland” has also been released.

Broadcast 
The first two episodes were released on the C More VOD platform on April 14, 2022, after which one episode was released each week. C More also premiered the series in other Nordic countries in May 2022.

Episodes

References

External links 
 Made in Finland -series on C More
 The official trailer
 

Finnish drama television series
2020s Finnish television series